Binny and the Ghost is a German crime-mystery television series for children and teenagers, which was produced by UFA Fiction for the Walt Disney Company (Germany). The series was created by producer Steffi Ackermann and author Vivien Hoppe. The first episode of the series premiered in Germany on March 23, 2013 on Disney Channel. The series finale aired on Disney Channel in Germany on May 15, 2016. The plot of the series was concluded in the last episode.

Plot 
13-year-old Binny moves with her parents from Hamburg to Berlin into an ancient villa. There she discovers that her room is already inhabited by a 14-year-old ghost named Melchior. However, he doesn't know why he has been a ghost for over a hundred years. Melchior does not know the 21st century, and Binny does not understand Melchior, who was born in 1900. Finally, in order to get rid of the ghost that is completely upsetting her life, Binny decides to help Melchior uncover the secret about his past. Only in this way can Melchior be freed from his ghostly life. In the process, the two teenagers often get involved in dangerous situations and have to solve crimes together. Binny and Melchior help people as well as ghosts whose bodies are trapped in the human world as long as their last task is not fulfilled. And the Watch Hunters in particular want to prevent Binny and Melchior from discovering the truth about the magical watches and the spirit world.

Production

Development 
In 2012, the German Disney Channel convinced the US parent company Disney that they be allowed to produce their own series of programs.  They searched for new ideas from independent production companies and were attracted by the pitch from  under the working title Binny und der Geist.  The idea for the series came from the producer Steffi Ackermann and the author Vivien Hoppe, while casting was carried out by Daniela Tolkien.  On 8 November 2012, the production of a pilot episode of Binny and the Ghost was confirmed.   became UFA Fiction in August 2013.

Filming
Shooting the pilot episode began on 9 November 2012 in Berlin and the surrounding area, followed by the first season of Binny and the Ghost. Filming of the first season continued until autumn 2014. The long timescale was due, among other reasons, to the availability of the main actors which was restricted to the school holidays. Filming of the second season began on 13 March 2015 and continued until the end of 2015. One episode of the second season was filmed in the zoo on the Reilsberg in Halle.

Cast and characters

Main 
 Merle Juschka as Binny Baumann, a teen girl who tries to help Melchior with different problems.
 Johannes Hallervorden as Melchior von und zu Panke, a friendly and funny teen ghost.
 Katharina Kaali as Wanda Baumann, Binny's mother.
 Steffen Groth as Ronald Baumann, Binny's father. 
 Eliz Tabea Thrun as Luca Schuster, Binny's friend and classmate.
 Stefan Weinert as Hubertus van Horas, the main antagonist of the first season.
 Stefan Becker as Bodo, Hubertus and Rhett's second-in-command. 
 Robert Köhler as Rhett Thorn, the main antagonist of the second season.

Recurring 
 Inga Busch as Steffi Schubert
 Anselm Bresgott as Mark
 Patrick von Blume as Principal Rötig
 Paul Maximilian Schüller as Martin
 Hoang Dang-Vu as Jan
 Lucas Reiber as Niklas Neudecker

Episodes

Series overview

Season 1 (2013–2015)

Season 2 (2016)

Release 
Germany, Austria and Switzerland
The pilot episode of the series aired on March 23, 2013 on Disney Channel, which at the time was only available on pay TV. Season 1 first aired regularly from October 26, 2014 to January 18, 2015 on Disney Channel, which is now on free TV. The second and final season first aired on Disney Channel from April 10, 2016 to May 15, 2016. Seasons 1 and 2 were added to Disney+ on October 23, 2020.

Africa, Middle East and Balkans
The first season premiered on Disney Channel on December 13, 2014. Season 2 premiered on Disney Channel on July 7, 2016. In South Africa, seasons 1 and 2 were added to Disney+ on May 18, 2022.

UK and Ireland
The first season premiered on July 27, 2015 on Disney Channel under the title "Billie and the Ghost" and with a British-English dub. Season 2 premiered on Disney+ on May 18, 2022 and was released along with the first season under the title "Binny and the Ghost" and with English dubbing from the US.

United States and Canada
To date, the series has not been released in the United States or Canada.

Awards and nominations

Trivia 
 In the United Kingdom and Ireland, the first season of the series was broadcast on the Disney Channel under the title Billie and the Ghost. In the British-English dub of the first season, created specifically for these two territories, Binny was renamed Billie and Melchior was renamed Malcolm.

 In the eighth episode of the first season, one horse is named Maximus, which is a reference to the horse Maximus from Disney's animated film Tangled. Both horses have the same fearless and brave personality, but differ in coat color.

 The third episode of the second season was filmed at the Bergzoo in Halle (Saale). Famous backdrops were the Humboldt penguin enclosure, the predator house as well as the seal enclosure and the skull monkey tunnel near the zoo entrance.

References

External links 
 
 
 Binny and the Ghost at crew united
 Binny and the Ghost at Fernsehserien.de

2013 German television series debuts
2016 German television series endings
German crime television series
German comedy television series
German fantasy television series
German supernatural television series
Disney Channels Worldwide original programming
Television series by Disney
German-language Disney Channel original programming